Opposition Alliance may refer to:

Nation Alliance, an electoral alliance of opposition parties in Turkey
Opposition Alliance, the National-Liberal Alliance formed in Western Australia in 2021.
Opposition Alliance of Kosovo
South Sudan Opposition Alliance, a coalition of political parties and armed groups in South Sudan